Valemetostat (trade name Ezharmia) is a drug used for the treatment of adult T-cell leukemia/lymphoma (ATL).

Valemetostat is an inhibitor of the enzymes enhancer of zeste homolog 1 (EZH1) and enhancer of zeste homolog 2 (EZH2), which are implicated in the etiology of some forms of cancer including non-Hodgkin lymphomas.

In Japan, valemetostat was approved in September 2022 for patients with relapsed or refractory adult T-cell leukemia/lymphoma.

References 

Antineoplastic and immunomodulating drugs
Benzodioxoles
Dimethylamino compounds
Chloroarenes
Pyridines
Carboxamides